Modupe Afolabi Jemi-Alade (December 14, 1937 - June 29, 1993) popularly known as Art Alade was a Nigerian television personality and producer who was the host of The Bar Beach Show a weekly variety show on NBC-TV that aired during the 1970s. He retired from NTA in 1979 as acting Director of Programmes.

After he left NTA, he embarked on a career in music and established a club Art's Place where he performed regularly.

Life
Alade was born on December 14, 1937 to the family of Babatunde and Abiodun Jemi-Alade, his father  Babatunde Jemi Alade who was the first Yagba man to become a Principal Custom's officer in Lagos in the early 1929s and his mother taught music at a girl's only school, she was a granddaughter of Mohammed Shitta Bey.He was married to Olapeju Olufunmilayo Cole and they had 5 children.

Alade graduated from C.M.S. Grammar School, Lagos and  then traveled abroad to attend Devon Technical College and London School of Television Production in the U.K.. Alade began his career as a musician on a cruise line, the Greek Line. By 1964, on his return from U.K., he joined the staff of Nigerian Broadcasting Corporation now known as NTA.

He compered the hugely popular 'Bar Beach Show' and hosted the 'Art Alade Show'- the first Variety Show on Network TV in Africa. In 1979 he established 'Arts Place' an entertainment centre comprising a night club, restaurant and art gallery.

Alade was appointed acting director of Programmes in 1978 and retired a year later.

He is the father  of Nigerian multi-platinum selling and award-winning musician, singer-songwriter, and Idol series judge popularly called Darey.

He died on 29 June 1993 at the age of 55

References

Nigerian television producers
1937 births
1993 deaths